General Boyle may refer to:

Charles Boyle, 4th Earl of Orrery (1674–1731), British Army major general
Edmund Boyle, 8th Earl of Cork (1767–1856), British Army general
Jean Boyle (born 1947), Royal Canadian Air Force general
Jeremiah Boyle (1818–1871), Union Army brigadier general
Leo Boyle (1899–1969), U.S. Army National Guard major general
Richard Boyle, 2nd Viscount Shannon (1675–1740), British Army general